Lucking or Luecking is a surname, and may refer to:

 Alfred Lucking (1856–1929), American politician
 William Lucking (born 1941), American film, television, and stage actor
 Robert Lücking (born 1964), German lichenologist
 Juliana Luecking, musician, American spoken-word artist and video maker

See also
 Luckin Coffee
 Luck (disambiguation)
 Lück (disambiguation)
 Lucks (disambiguation)
 Lucky (disambiguation)